Okpe is an Edoid language of Nigeria spoken by the Urhobo people.

Phonology
The sound system is rather conservative, and nearly the same as that of Urhobo. The vowels system is the same, and somewhat reduced compared to proto-Edoid: there are seven vowels, .

References

Edoid languages